The Canada men's national ice hockey team (popularly known as Team Canada) is the ice hockey team representing Canada internationally. The team is overseen by Hockey Canada, a member of the International Ice Hockey Federation. From 1920 until 1963, Canada's international representation was by senior amateur club teams. Canada's national men's team was founded in 1963 by Father David Bauer as a part of the Canadian Amateur Hockey Association, playing out of the University of British Columbia.
The nickname "Team Canada" was first used for the 1972 Summit Series and has been frequently used to refer to both the Canadian national men's and women's teams ever since.

Canada is the leading national ice hockey team in international play, having won the 1972 Summit Series against the Soviet Union, a record four Canada Cups dating back to 1976, a record two World Cups of Hockey, a record nine Olympic gold medals, and a record 27 World Championship titles.

Canada is one of the most successful national ice hockey teams in the world and a member of the so-called "Big Six", the unofficial group of the six strongest men's ice hockey nations, along with Russia, the United States, Sweden, Finland, and the Czech Republic.

History
Hockey is Canada's national winter sport, and Canadians are extremely passionate about the game. Canada was first represented internationally at the 1910 European Championships by the Oxford Canadians, a team of Canadians from the University of Oxford. They represented Canada again at the 1912 World Championships.

From 1920 until 1963, the senior amateur club teams representing Canada, were usually the most recent Allan Cup champions. The last amateur club team from Canada to win a gold medal at the World Championship was the Trail Smoke Eaters in 1961. The responsibility of choosing which team represented Canada belonged to Canadian Amateur Hockey Association (CAHA) secretary-manager; George Dudley from 1947 to 1960, and Gordon Juckes from 1960 to 1963.

Following the 1963 World Championships, Father David Bauer founded the national team as a permanent institution. The new permanent national team first competed in ice hockey at the 1964 Winter Olympics. His philosophy was to simply win the games against the weaker countries instead of running up the score. Canada, Czechoslovakia and Sweden finished with identical records of five wins and two losses. Canada thought they had won the bronze medal based on the goal differential in the three games among the tied countries. When they attended the presentation of the Olympic medals, they were disappointed to learn they had finished in fourth place based on goal differential of all seven games played. The players and CAHA president Art Potter accused that International Ice Hockey Federation (IIHF) president Bunny Ahearne, made a last-minute decision to change the rules and take away a medal from Canada. Marshall Johnston summarized the team's feeling that, "The shepherd and his flock had been fleeced".

Before the Soviet Union began international competition in 1954, Canada dominated international hockey, winning six out of seven golds at the Olympics and 10 World Championship gold medals. Canada then went 50 years without winning the Winter Olympic Gold medal and from 1962 to 1993, didn't win any World Championships. This was in part because Canada's best professional players were unable to attend these events as they had commitments with their National Hockey League teams.

Canada was awarded hosting duties of the 1970 Ice Hockey World Championships with the limited use of former professionals. The IIHF later reversed the permission after International Olympic Committee president Avery Brundage objected to professionals at an amateur event. CAHA president Earl Dawson withdrew the national team from international competitions against European hockey teams until Canada was allowed to use its best players.

Canada returned to the IIHF in 1977 after a series of negotiations between IIHF President Dr. Sabetzki and top officials of professional ice hockey in Canada and the United States. As a result, professionals are allowed to compete at the World Championship and the tournament is scheduled later in the year to ensure more players are available from among the NHL teams eliminated from the Stanley Cup playoffs. In return, a competition for the "Canada Cup" was to be played every four years on North American territory with the participation of Canada, the United States, and the four strongest European national teams, including professionals.

In 1983, Hockey Canada began the "Program of Excellence", whose purpose was to prepare a team for the Winter Olympics every four years. This new National Team played a full season together all over the world against both national and club teams, and often attracted top NHL prospects. In 1986, the International Olympic Committee voted to allow professional athletes to compete in Olympic Games, starting in 1988. Veteran pros with NHL experience and, in a few cases, current NHLers who were holding out in contract disputes joined the team.  This program was discontinued in 1998, when the NHL began shutting down to allow its players to compete.

After not winning a gold medal for 33 years, Canada won the 1994 World Championship in Italy. Since that time, they have won in 1997, 2003, 2004, 2007, 2015, 2016 and 2021. Canada captured its first Olympic gold medal in 50 years at Salt Lake City 2002. At Vancouver 2010, Canada won the gold medal with a 3–2 win against the United States in the final. Sidney Crosby's overtime goal secured Canada the final gold medal awarded at the Games. At the 2012 World Championship in Finland and Sweden, Ryan Murray became the first draft eligible prospect to represent Canada at the Ice Hockey World Championship.

Canada successfully defended gold at Sochi 2014, becoming the first men's team to do so since the Soviet Union in 1988, the first to finish the tournament undefeated since 1984 and the first to do both with a full NHL participation. Their relentless offensive pressure and stifling defence has earned the 2014 squad praise as perhaps the best, most complete Team Canada ever assembled. Drew Doughty and Shea Weber led the team in scoring, while Jonathan Toews scored the gold medal-winning goal in the first period of a 3–0 win over Sweden in the final. The architect behind the 2010 and 2014 teams, Steve Yzerman, immediately stepped down as general manager following the win.

Led by general manager Jim Nill, head coach Todd McLellan, and the late addition of captain Sidney Crosby, Canada won the 2015 IIHF World Championship in dominating fashion over Russia, their first win at the Worlds since 2007. By winning all 10 of their games in regulation, Hockey Canada was awarded a 1 million Swiss franc bonus prize in the first year of its existence. Canada scored 66 goals in their 10 games and had the top three scorers of the tournament: Jason Spezza, Jordan Eberle and Taylor Hall. Tyler Seguin also led the championship with nine goals. The win secured Canada's return to number one on the IIHF world rankings for the first time since 2010.

At the 2021 IIHF World Championship, following a cancelled 2020 tournament due to the COVID-19 pandemic, Canada returned to the competition with a roster weaker than most years, featuring rare inclusions of draft prospects and other non-NHL prospects. The team lost three games in regulation to start the tournament, the first Canadian team in Worlds history to do so, and needed 10 points over the final four round robin games to make the playoff round. Winning the tiebreaker over Kazakhstan, Canada qualified for the playoff round as the lowest seed and managed wins over Russia and the United States before playing Finland for a rematch of the 2019 final in the gold medal game. Nick Paul's goal won the game for Canada in overtime, despite the Finns having either led or been tied the entire game, capping off a most unlikely Canadian IIHF men's gold.

List of teams representing Canada from 1920 to 1963

Competition achievements

Olympic Games

All Olympic ice hockey tournaments between 1920 and 1968 also counted as World Championships.

World Championships

All Olympic ice hockey tournaments between 1920 and 1968 also counted as World Championships. World Championships were not held from 1940 to 1946 during World War II and during the Winter Olympic years of 1980, 1984 or 1988. The 2020 tournament was cancelled due to the COVID-19 pandemic.

Canada Cup / World Cup of Hockey
1976 – Champions
1981 – Runners-up
1984 – Champions
1987 – Champions
1991 – Champions
1996 – Runners-up
2004 – Champions
2016 – Champions

Summit Series
1972 – Winners
1974 – Runners-up

Spengler Cup
In the Spengler Cup, Team Canada competes against European club teams, such as HC Davos who host the tournament every year in Vaillant Arena. Canada was initially represented by the standing national team at this event, but subsequently is usually made up of Canadians playing in European leagues or the American Hockey League. In 2019, Team Canada won its 16th Spengler Cup, passing the host team HC Davos (last win in 2011) for the most titles.

Team

Current roster
Roster for the 2022 IIHF World Championship.

Head coach: Claude Julien

Coaches
List of coaches of the Canada men's national ice hockey team.

Olympics

Summit Series, Canada Cup, World Cup

World Championships

Uniform evolution

Notable jerseys

See also

 List of Canadian national ice hockey team rosters
 List of Olympic men's ice hockey players for Canada

References

Bibliography
 
 
 
 
 Meltzer, Bill NHL.com article on 2007 IIHF World Championship gold medal. Retrieved 2008-03-25.

External links

IIHF profile
National Teams of Ice Hockey

 
National ice hockey teams in the Americas
National sports teams of Canada